Abdesslam Yassine (1928 – December 13, 2012) was the leader of the Moroccan Islamist  organisation Al Adl Wa Al Ihssane (Justice and Spirituality).

Yassine was born in Marrakesh.  He worked as a teacher and a school inspector for the Ministry of Education, and from 1965 on, was a member of one of the most famous Moroccan Sufi brotherhoods, the Boutchichiyya. Yassine reportedly fell out with the leadership of the brotherhood over its refusal to engage more directly in political matters, and founded his own organisation. Yassine was jailed in a mental asylum for three years for publishing an open letter to King Hassan II denouncing his rule as unIslamic. Following his release he was kept under house arrest for many years, before eventually being released in the early years of the rule of King Mohammed VI. Yassine's many publications include L'Islam ou le Deluge (Islam or the Flood), probably the best known of his works.  He died, aged 84, on 13 December 2012. He was married to Khadija Al Malki who died in late March 2015.

Books

originally written in Arabic
Islam between the Appeal and the State, 1972
Tomorrow Islam!, 1973
Islam—or the Flood (An Open Letter to the Late King of Morocco), 1974
The Royal Century Missive in the Balance of Islam, 1980
The Prophetic Method [al-Minhāj an-Nabawi], 1982
Islam and the Challenge of Marxism-Leninism, 1987
Exemplary Men (1st in the series Al-Ihssān), 1988
Introductions to the Method, 1989
Islam and the Challenge of Secular Nationalism, 1989
Reflections on Islamic Jurisprudence and History, 1990
Spiritual Gems (A Collection of Poems), 1992
The Muslim Mind on Trial: Divine Revelation versus Secular Rationalism, 1994
A Dialogue with Honorable Democrats, 1994
Letter of Reminder (1st in the series Rasa’il Al-Ihsān), 1995
On the Economy, 1995
Letter to Students and to all Muslims (2nd in the series Rassa’il Al-Ihssân), 1995
Guide to Believing Women, 1996
Shūra and Democracy, 1996
Poetic Exhortations (3rd in the series Rasa’il Al- Ihsān), 1996
Dialogue of the Past and the Future, 1997
Dialogue with an Amazighit Friend, 1997
Spirituality [Al-Ihssān] V1, 1998
How Shall We Renew Our Iman? How Do We Advise For God’s Sake And His Messenger? (1st in the series “The Prophetic Method Discourses”), 1998
Al-Fitra And The Remedial Treatment Of Prophecy For Hearts (2nd in the series “The Prophetic Method Discourses”), 1998
Spirituality [Al-Ihssān] V2, 1999
Hearts Sincerity (3rd in the series “The Prophetic Method Discourses”), 1999
Braving the Obstacles (4th in the series “The Prophetic Method Discourses”), 1999
Justice: Islamists and Governance, 2000
Bunches of Grapes (A Collection of Poems), 2000
The Scholarly Treatise, 2001
Caliphate and Monarchy, 2001
Exemplary Men of Uprising and Reform, 2001
Day and Night Schedule of the Believer, 2002
The Price (5th in the series “The Prophetic Method Discourses”), 2004
God’s Custom, 2005
Introductions to the future of Islam, 2005
Day and Night Schedule of the Believer (a book in Arabic and English), 2007
Leadership of the Umma, 2009
Qur’ān and Prophecy, 2010
The Muslim Community and its Bond, 2012

originally written in French
The Islamic Method of Revolution, 1980
Toward a Dialog with our Westernized Elite, 1980
Winning the Modern World for Islam, 1998
Memorandum: To Him Who Is Concerned (an open letter in French to the country's new king, Mohamed VI), 1999

translated into English
Memorandum: To Him Who Is Concerned (Traslation of an open letter in French to the country’s new king, Mohamed VI), 1999
Winning the Modern World for Islam, 2000
The MuslimMind on Trial: Divine Revelation versus SecularRationalism, 2003
Day and Night Schedule of the Believer (A book in Arabic and English), 2007
The Last Testament of Imam Abdessalam Yassine 2013

References

External links
 Abdesslam Yassin's Web site (Arabic)
Al Adl wa al Ihsaan homepage (Arabic)
 An online library of Abdesslam Yassin's works

1928 births
2012 deaths
Moroccan writers
Moroccan Sufis
Al Adl Wa Al Ihssane politicians
People from Marrakesh
Moroccan educators
Deaths from influenza